The Pac-12 Conference men's basketball tournament, otherwise known as the Pac-12 tournament, is the annual concluding tournament for the NCAA college basketball in the Pac-12, taking place in Las Vegas at the T-Mobile Arena. The first tournament was held in 1987 for the Pac-10 conference. It ended after four seasons. The conference did not have a conference tournament until it was started again in 2002.

History
The predecessor conference of the Pac-12, the Pacific Coast Conference, began playing basketball in the 1915–16 season. The PCC was split into North and South Divisions for basketball beginning with the 1922–23 season. The winners of the two divisions would play a best of three series of games to determine the PCC basketball champion. If two division teams tied, they would have a one-game playoff to produce the division representative. Starting with the first edition of the event now known as the NCAA Division I men's basketball tournament in 1939, the winner of the PCC divisional playoff was given the automatic berth in the NCAA tournament. Oregon, the 1939 PCC champion, won the championship game in the 1939 NCAA basketball tournament.
 
The last divisional playoff was in the 1954–55 season. After that, there was no divisional play and all teams played each other in a round robin competition. From the 1955–56 season through the 1985–86 season, the regular season conference champion was awarded the NCAA tournament berth from the PCC, later AAWU, Pac-8 and Pac-10.
 
Beginning with the 1975 NCAA tournament, the league (known as the Pac-8 until becoming the Pac-10 with the 1978 arrival of Arizona and Arizona State) would usually place at least one other at-large team in the tournament. Following the end of UCLA's dominance in the 1970s, the Pac-10 would struggle to get out of the early rounds of the NCAA tournament.
 
By the 1985–86 season, the Pac-10 was one of three remaining conferences that gave their automatic NCAA tournament bid to the regular season round-robin champion. The other two conferences were the Ivy League and the Big Ten Conference.

1987–1990

The modern tournament format began in 1987 as the Pacific-10 Men's basketball Tournament. The first incarnation of the tournament ran from 1987 to 1990, hosted at different school sites. UCLA was awarded the inaugural tournament, which was won by the Bruins. The Arizona Wildcats hosted the 1988 tournament and won. The Wildcats also won the 1989 and 1990 tournaments. Citing academic concerns, it was dropped after 1990 upon opposition from coaches, poor revenue, and poor attendance. The Pac-10 went back to having the regular season champion get awarded the automatic NCAA tournament bid for the 1990–2001 seasons. The Pac-10 also was viewed as weaker than East coast conferences that placed many teams in the NCAA tournament. The tournament was seen as more damaging to the conference than helpful. The NCAA selection show occurred during or immediately following the Sunday final. This meant the selection committee had to make a decision to have a placeholder for a potential team that depended upon the final result.

2002 to the present
In 1998, the Big Ten began to hold a conference tournament, leaving the Pac-10 and Ivy League the lone conferences without postseason tournaments. (The Ivy League would not begin holding its tournament until 2017.) The Pac-10 tournament was restarted by an 8–2 vote of the athletic directors of the conference in 2000 after determining that a tournament would help increase exposure of the conference and help the seeding of the schools in the NCAA tournament. Stanford University and the University of Arizona opposed the tournament, while UCLA's and USC's votes, considered the deciding votes, were swayed by permanently hosting the tournament at Staples Center. Los Angeles is the second largest media market in the United States. The championship game has been broadcast nationally by CBS Sports. The championship game was scheduled for Saturday before selection Sunday, as opposed to the previous iteration of the tournament holding the championship on Sunday after the selection committee had completed their work.
 
With the 2011 championship game attracting only 12,074 paid attendees, less than two-thirds the capacity of Staples Center, commissioner Larry Scott reopened bids from other cities to host the Pac-12 Tournament. Other models including a round-robin model and hosting the tournament at conference sites have also been considered. Ultimately, Las Vegas, Los Angeles, Salt Lake City, and Seattle submitted bids for consideration.
 
On March 13, 2012, the Pac-12 Tournament was officially moved to the MGM Grand Garden Arena in Las Vegas, Nevada, for a three-year term. The tournament moved to T-Mobile Arena once it opened during the 2016–17 basketball season; the hosting contract between the Pac-12 and the arena ran through 2020. In October 2019, the contract was extended through 2021-2022.

The 2020 tournament began on March 11, and teams played the first round. It was cancelled on March 12 due to the Covid-19 pandemic, with no further games played. The 2021 tournament was played, but with only family of student-athletes & members of the individual athletic departments as spectators in attendance.

Television coverage
Effective with the 2012–13 season, as part of the new television contract signed with Fox Sports and ESPN, one quarterfinal game, one semifinal game, and the championship game will rotate between Fox Sports and ESPN, with ESPN obtaining odd year tournaments and Fox Sports even numbered tournaments. All other games are broadcast on the Pac-12 Network.  On September 29, 2021, the Conference announced the Pac-12 Network, FOX & FS1 would be the telecast providers for the 2022 Pac-12 tournament.  Eight games would be featured on the Pac-12 Network, two games would be featured on FS1 & the Pac-12 Tournament Title game would be featured on FOX.

Format
From 1987 to 1990 and 2006 to 2011, all ten teams participated in the tournament, with the top six teams receiving a bye in the opening round. Between 2002 and 2005, only the top eight teams in the conference participated in the tournament. Of the Pac-12 schools, only Washington State has never played in the championship game. In 2010 with USC on probation, only nine teams participated. Since 2012, all 12 teams have participated with the top four teams getting byes into the quarterfinals.

Results

notes: † Arizona vacated 2017, 2018 titles due to NCAA penalty
^According to the Pac-12, family members were allowed to attend, but the general public was not allowed. As a result, the Pac-12 has not released official attendance numbers.

Venues

School records

through 2023 

† Arizona vacated all tournament wins and 2017, 2018 titles due to NCAA penalty (Arizona’s revised all-time tournament record - 32-15)
*USC vacated its win vs. ASU in the 2009 Pac-10 Tournament.
Washington State has yet to make an appearance in a Pac-12 Men's Basketball Championship Game.

Tournament MVP by School
through 2023 tournament

†Arizona had Co-MVP winners for the 1990 tournament.
Arizona State, California, USC, Utah & Washington State have yet to have a player win tournament MVP.

Performance by team
through march 10, 2023 

† Arizona vacated 2017, 2018 titles due to NCAA penalty
Key

Coaches with championships 
4 – Lute Olson (Arizona – 1988, 1989, 1990, 2002)
3 – Sean Miller† (Arizona – 2015, 2017, 2018)
3 – Lorenzo Romar (Washington – 2005, 2010, 2011)
3 – Dana Altman (Oregon – 2013, 2016, 2019)
2 – Tommy Lloyd (Arizona – 2022-23)
2 – Ben Howland (UCLA – 2006, 2008)
2 – Ernie Kent (Oregon – 2003, 2007)
1 – Mike Montgomery (Stanford – 2004)
1 – Walt Hazzard (UCLA – 1987)
1 – Tim Floyd (USC – 2009)
1 – Tad Boyle (Colorado – 2012)
1 – Steve Alford (UCLA – 2014) 
1 – Wayne Tinkle (Oregon State – 2021)
notes:† Arizona vacated 2017, 2018 titles due to NCAA penalty

Coaches by all-time winning % 
() – Tommy Lloyd (Arizona), (6−0)
() – Walt Hazzard (UCLA), (3−1)
() – Sean Miller (Arizona), (18−7)† 
() – Lute Olson (Arizona), (16−6)
() – Dana Altman (Oregon), (22−9)
() – Tim Floyd (USC), (6−3)
() – Bill Frieder (ASU), (2−1)
() – Steve Alford (UCLA), (7−4)
() – Tad Boyle (Colorado), (18−12)
() – Jim Harrick (UCLA), (3−2)
() – Ben Howland (UCLA), (11−8)
() – Lorenzo Romar (Washington), (15−11)
() – Henry Bibby (USC), (4−3)
() – Mick Cronin (UCLA), (4−3)
() – Cuonzo Martin (California), (4−3)
() – Ernie Kent (Oregon/Washington St.), (11−11)
() – Ben Braun (California), (7−7)
() – Tony Bennett (Washington St.), (3−3)
() – Steve Lavin (UCLA), (3−3)
() – Ralph Miller (Oregon St.), (3−3)
() – Andy Russo (Washington), (3−3)
() – Kyle Smith (Washington State), (3−3)
() – Murry Bartow (UCLA), (1−1)
() – Andy Enfield (USC), (7−8)
() – Wayne Tinkle (OSU), (6−7)
() – Mike Montgomery (Stanford/California), (10−12)
() – Johnny Dawkins (Stanford), (6−8)
() – Bobby Hurley (ASU), (5−7)
() – Larry Krystkowiak (Utah), (7−10)
() – Mark Fox (California), (2−3)
() – Kevin O’Neill (Arizona/USC), (2−3)
() – Kelvin Sampson (Washington St.), (2−3)
() – Mike Hopkins (Washington), (3−6)
() – Craig Robinson (Oregon St.), (3−6)
() – Lou Campanelli (Cal), (2−4)
() – Jay John (OSU), (2−4)
() – Don Monson (Oregon), (2−4)
() – George Ravelling (USC), (2−4)
() – Jerod Haase (Stanford), (3−7)
() – Herb Sendek (ASU), (3−9)
() – Craig Smith (Utah), (0−2)
Note:† Miller’s six wins and tournament titles in 2017 & 2018 vacated due to NCAA penalty (Miller’s revised tournament record - 12-7, .632)
Coaches with at least one win are listed here. Current coaches are in bold.

Coaches by tournament wins 
22 – Dana Altman (Oregon), (22−9) 
18 – Sean Miller (Arizona), (18−7)†
18 – Tad Boyle (Colorado), (18−12)
16 – Lute Olson (Arizona), (16−6)
15 – Lorenzo Romar (Washington), (15−11)
11 – Ben Howland (UCLA), (11−8)
11 – Ernie Kent (Oregon/Washington State), (11−11)
10 – Mike Montgomery (Stan/Cal), (10−12) 
7 – Andy Enfield (USC), (7−8)
7 – Ben Braun (Cal), (7−8)
7 – Larry Krystkowiak (Utah), (7−10)
6 – Tommy Lloyd (Arizona), (6−0)
6 – Steve Alford (UCLA), (6−3)
6 –  Tim Floyd (USC), (6−3)
6 – Wayne Tinkle (OSU), (6−7)
6 – Johnny Dawkins (Stanford), (6−8)
5 – Bobby Hurley (ASU), (5−7)
4 – Mick Cronin (UCLA), (4−3)
4 – Henry Bibby (USC), (4−3)
4 – Cuonzo Martin (California), (4−3)
3 – Walt Hazzard (UCLA), (3−1)
3 – Jim Harrick (UCLA), (3−2)
3 – Steve Lavin (UCLA), (3−3)
3 – Andy Russo (Washington), (3−3)
3 – Kyle Smith (Washington State), (3−3)
3 – Mike Hopkins (Washington), (3−6)
3 – Craig Robinson (OSU), (3−6)
3 – Jerod Haase (Stanford), (3−7)
3 – Herb Sendek (ASU), (3−9)
2 – Bill Frieder (ASU), (2−1)
2 – Mark Fox (California), (2−3)
2 – Kelvin Sampson (WSU), (2−3)
2 – Lou Campanelli (Cal), (2−4)
2 – Jay John (OSU), (2−4)
2 – Don Monson (Oregon), (2−4)
1 – Murray Bartow (UCLA), (1−1)
0 – Craig Smith (Utah), (0−2)

Note:† Miller’s six wins and tournament titles in 2017 & 2018 vacated due to NCAA penalty (Miller’s revised tournament record - 12-7, .632)
Only coaches with 1 or more wins listed here.
As of March 11, 2023

All-time records by seed 

As of March 11, 2023

†Arizona vacated all wins & titles from 2017, 2018 due to NCAA penalty
*USC vacated its win vs. ASU in the 2009 Pac-10 Tournament.

Pac-12 Tournament records

Pac-12 Tournament team records
 Margin of victory: 33 pts., Oregon (vs. Washington State), (84–51), Mar. 13, 2019
 Most points per game: 103 USC, (vs. Stanford) (78), Mar. 7, 2002
 Fewest points per game: 39 Utah vs. Arizona, Mar. 13, 2014 
 Most points per half:  59 ARIZ vs. OSU (21), Mar. 12, 2008 (1st); 59 ORE vs. COLO (48), Mar. 12, 2015
 Fewest points per half: 13 UTAH vs. ARIZ (34), Mar. 13, 2014 
 Most points per tournament: 278 Arizona,  (3 games) Mar. 1988 
 Most field goals per game
 Team: 39 UCLA, (vs. ASU) (39-of-71), Mar. 6, 1987 
 Both Teams: 70, UCLA (39) vs. ASU (31), Mar. 6, 1987; 
 Both Teams: 70, Arizona (37) vs. OSU (33), Mar. 11, 1989 
 Most field goal attempts per game
 Team: 88, Arizona (vs. UCLA), Mar. 13, 2003 (33-of-88) (OT)
 Both Teams, Game: 157, UCLA (69) vs. ARIZ (88), Mar. 13, 2003 (OT)
 Highest Field Goals % per game: 68.3%, CAL vs. USC, Mar. 10, 1988 (28-of-41) 
 Most Assists Per Game: 23, ARIZ vs. OSU, Mar. 11, 1989
 Most Steals Per Game: 14, USC vs. CAL, Mar. 14, 2003; 14, ASU vs. USC, Mar. 13, 2008;
 14, UCLA vs. USC, Mar. 13, 2009 
 Most blocked shots per game: 9, ORE vs. WASH, Mar. 7, 2002 
 Most personal fouls per game (one team): 42, Oregon 42 (vs. UCLA) (1990)
 Highest field goal percentage per game: .683, CAL vs. USC, Mar. 10, 1988 (28-of-41)
 Lowest field goal percentage per game: .255 Utah vs. Arizona, Mar. 13, 2014 (12-of-47)

Pac-12 Tournament individual records
 Most total points scored in:
 Half: 25, Klay Thompson, Washington State vs. Washington, Mar. 10, 2011 (2nd) 
 Game: 43, Klay Thompson, Washington State vs. Washington, Mar. 10, 2011 
 Tournament: 83, Reggie Miller, UCLA, 1987 (3 games)
 Most field goals per :
 Game: 15, Reggie Miller, UCLA vs. Arizona State, Mar. 6, 1987 (15-of 20)
 15, Klay Thompson, Washington State vs. Washington, Mar. 10, 2011 (15-of-29) 
 Tournament: 27, Reggie Miller, UCLA, 1987 (3 games) 
 Most field goal attempts per:
 Game: 29, Klay Thompson, Washington State vs. Washington, Mar. 10, 2011 (15-of-29) 
 Tournament: 60, Brook Lopez, Stanford, 2008 (25-of-60, 3 games) 
 Field goal percentage per:
 Game (min 10 made): 1.000 Bryce Taylor, Oregon vs. USC, Mar. 10, 2007 (11-of-11) 
 Tournament (min 15 made): .791 Isaac Austin, Arizona State, 1988 (19-of-24, 3 games)
 Game: Most 3-pt. FGs made
 11 Alfonso Plummer, Utah vs. OSU, Mar. 11, 2020 (11-of-16) 
 Highest 3-pt. FG % (min. 3)
 Game: 100%, Bryce Taylor, Oregon vs. USC, Mar. 10, 2007 (7-of-7)
 Most total rebounds per :
 Game: 20 Leon Powe, California vs. USC, Mar. 9, 2006 
 Tournament: 41 André Roberson, Colorado, 2012 (4 games);
 Most steals per :
 Game: 7 James Harden, Arizona State vs. USC, Mar. 13, 2008
 Tournament: 10 Jordan McLaughlin, USC, 2018 (3 games)
 Most blocks per:
 Game: 6 Josh Huestis, Stanford vs. Arizona State, Mar. 13, 2013; Malik Dime, Washington vs. USC, Mar. 8, 2017; Francis Okoro, Oregon vs. Utah, March 14, 2019; Oumar Ballo, Arizona vs. UCLA, March 12, 2022
 Tournament: 10 Evan Mobley, USC, 2021 (2 games); 10 Kenny Wooten, Oregon, 2019 (4 games); 9 Sean Rooks, Arizona, 1990 (3 games); Kingsley Okoroh, California, 2017 (3 games)

Pac-12 Tournament final game team records
 Most total points scored in a final game: 172 (Arizona 94, UCLA 78)(1990)

References

External links
 Pac-12 Tournament History

 
Recurring sporting events established in 1987